The Herndon Depot Museum, also known as the Herndon Historical Society Museum, is located in the town of Herndon in Fairfax County, Virginia. 
Built in 1857 for the Alexandria, Loudoun & Hampshire Railroad, the depot later served the Richmond and Danville Railroad, the Southern Railway and the Washington and Old Dominion Railroad.

The structure is located at 717 Lynn Street, at the intersection of the Washington & Old Dominion Railroad Trail and Station Street, north of Elden Street (signed nearby as Virginia State Routes 228 and 606).  The building is adjacent to Town Hall Square, which contains the Herndon Town Hall, built in 1939 as a Works Progress Administration project to house all of the Town's administrative offices.

The Herndon Historical Society operates the museum.

The depot was the site of a raid that Confederate Army Captain John S. Mosby led on St. Patrick's day in March 1863. Mosby and his men surprised the Union Army picket guarding the station and captured officers, soldiers and horses with no Confederate casualties.

The railroad was an integral part of Herndon's agricultural history as large dairy farms surrounded the village. Farmers would ship milk on the railroad daily to Washington for processing and distribution.  The railroad station became a center of the community. Businesses sprang up around the station, attracted by the ready access to transportation.

With the advent of cars, trucks and better roads, the railroad became less of a necessity for Herndon farmers and residents. The last major assignment for the railway was hauling sand to be used in the concrete mix for runways at Washington Dulles International Airport. The railroad and the depot closed in August 1968.

Victorian style buttresses under the eaves are the building's only decorative feature. The window and door framings and the two baggage doors are original, as are the semaphore and several pieces of hardware.

The Heritage Conservation and Recreation Service of the United States Department of the Interior added the building to the National Register of Historic Places on June 18, 1979. The building's site is marked as part of the Virginia Civil War Trails Program.

References

External links

  .
  .

Railway stations in the United States opened in 1857
Virginia municipal and county parks
Museums in Fairfax County, Virginia
Railroad museums in Virginia
History museums in Virginia
Railway stations on the National Register of Historic Places in Virginia
Stations along Southern Railway lines in the United States
Stations along Chesapeake and Ohio Railway lines
Railway stations closed in 1968
National Register of Historic Places in Fairfax County, Virginia
Individually listed contributing properties to historic districts on the National Register in Virginia
1857 establishments in Virginia